Katoo Ole Metito (born 1973) is a Kenyan politician and former Minister for provincial administration and Internal Security in the Kenyan government. He belongs to Jubilee Party and was elected to represent the Kajiado South Constituency (Loitoktok) in the National Assembly of Kenya since the 2007 Kenyan parliamentary election. He has been a blessing to his country since he contributed several projects for the maa people and others with the help of Kajiado Governor Joseph Ole Lenku. In 2022, he intends to vie for Kajiado county gubernatorial seat after winning the UDA nominations.

Education
Katoo Ole Metito holds a B.Sc. in Microprocessor Technology and Instrumentation from the University of Nairobi and a Higher Diploma (Management of Information Systems) from Strathmore College.

Politics
Ole Metito was appointed Minister for Provincial Administration and internal security by president Mwai Kibaki on September 24, 2012, following the death of his predecessor, Professor George Saitoti slightly over three months earlier on June 10, 2012. Before that, he was an Assistant Minister for the Ministry of Regional Development, a position he had held since 2008. A Kibaki loyalist, he was also the Secretary, Political Affairs and the Chairperson of NARC-Kenya, Loitokitok Branch.  
Between 2006 and 2008, he served as Assistant Minister of Youth Affairs within the Ministry of Youth and Sports.  He was the Member of Parliament for Kajiado South Constituency since 2002. Katoo ole metito will be vying for the gubernatorial position for Kajiado County in 2022.

Professional life
Outside politics, Katoo Ole Metito has served as an Administrator & Accountant for the Kenya Economic Pastoralist Development Association (2000 2001).  He has also worked for the United Nations World Food Programme as a Divisional Controller in Kenya from 1998 to 2000.  Before this appointment, he was an accountant with Amboseli Tsavo Group Ranches Conservation Association.

Katoo Ole Metito was elected in 2003 following the death of his predecessor Geoffrey Mepukori Parpai and intends to vie for Kajiado County gubernatorial seat come 2022 on a UDA ticket.

References

Living people
1973 births
National Rainbow Coalition – Kenya politicians
Members of the National Assembly (Kenya)